Paul Brown (1950–1997) was a senior journalist and presenter of Channel Report, Channel Television's flagship news programme. He joined Channel TV in 1972 as a reporter and during his 25-year career with the station, became one of the main presenters of Channel Report and one of the station's news editors.

He died suddenly in November 1997.

References

1950 births
1997 deaths